Leek County School Old Boys Football Club (usually shortened to Leek CSOB) is a football club based in Leek, Staffordshire, England.

History
The club was formed in 1945 and has been in continuous existence since then. They were Leek Minor League champions and Leek & Moorland League champions in 1962, and also won a number of local cups.

In 1984 CSOB were among the founder members of the Staffordshire Senior League. They won the championship of the league (which by this time had changed its name to the Midland League) in 1996, which gained them promotion to the North West Counties Football League Division Two. Two years later they were promoted to Division One, but lasted only three seasons at this level before being relegated back to Division Two, where they remain to this day (although it is now called Division One).

Stadium

The club has never had its own ground and for many years shared Leek Town's ground, Harrison Park.  A £300,000 donation received in 2002 gave CSOB the finances to build its own stadium, and as of August 2005 the club was in negotiations with Staffordshire Moorlands District Council to do so. These plans were subsequently rejected by the SMDC.  CSOB currently play their games at Pointon Park in Cheddleton.

Club records
Best league position: Midland League champions, 1995–96
Best FA Cup performance: 2nd qualifying round, 1998–99
Best FA Vase performance: 2nd round proper, 2000–01

References

External links
Official site

Football clubs in Staffordshire
North West Counties Football League clubs
Leek, Staffordshire
Association football clubs established in 1945
1945 establishments in England
Football clubs in England
Staffordshire County Senior League